Dirashe is one of the woredas in the Southern Nations, Nationalities, and Peoples' Region (SNNPR) of Ethiopia. Prior to 2011, Dirashe was not part of any Zone in the SNNPR and was therefore considered a Special woreda, an administrative subdivision which is similar to an autonomous area. In 2011, the Segen Area Peoples Zone was established, which includes Dirashe woreda and the 3 former special woredas surrounding it. It is named for the Dirashe people, whose homelands lie in the eastern part of this woreda.

Overview 
Located in the Great Rift Valley, Dirashe is bordered on the south by Konso special woreda, on the west by the Weito River which separates it from the Debub Omo Zone, on the north by the Gamo Gofa Zone, on the northeast by Lake Chamo, and on the east by Amaro special woreda. The administrative center of Dirashe is Gidole.

According to a 2004 report, Dirashe had 57 kilometers of all-weather roads and 44 kilometers of dry-weather roads, for an average road density of 66 kilometers per 1000 square kilometers. High points in Dirashe include Mount Gardolla (2545 meters).

History 
Dirashe special woreda was created following the founding of the SNNPR. It had never been part of a Zone until the creation of the Segen Area Peoples Zone in 2011.

In April 2002, several persons were killed and numerous houses were burned during fighting over a land dispute between the Dirashe and the Zayse. Local ruling party officials had incited the violence between the previously peaceful groups. By the end of the following year, the responsible local officials, who included the former woreda administrator, were found guilty of inciting the violence between the previously peaceful groups.

Human Rights Watch interviewed farmers on 25 June 2009, who claimed that they had been dispossessed of their lands and forced out of their homes for supporting opposition parties.

Demographics 
Based on the 2007 Census conducted by the Central Statistical Agency of Ethiopia (CSA), this woreda has a total population of 142,758, of whom 70,111 are men and 72,647 women. With an area of 1,487.38 square kilometers, Dirashe has a population density of 95.98; 13,184 or 9.24% are urban inhabitants. A total of 26,838 households were counted in this woreda, which results in an average of 5.32 persons to a household, and 26,102 housing units. The eight largest ethnic groups reported in this woreda were the Dirashe (45.01%), the Gawwada (27.94%), the Mossiya (9.27%), the Kusumie (5.08%), the Mashole (4.34%), the Konso (2.35%), the Gamo (1.76%), and the Amhara (1.62%); all other ethnic groups made up 2.63% of the population. Dirashe was spoken as a first language by 47.51% of the inhabitants, 27.43% spoke Gawwada, 9.09% spoke Bussa, 4.82% spoke Oromiffa, 4.1% spoke Amharic, 3.66% spoke Gamo, and 1.76% spoke Konso; the remaining 1.63% spoke all other primary languages reported. 50.03% were Protestants, 34.27% practiced Ethiopian Orthodox Christianity, and 12.84% of the population said they practiced traditional religions.

In the 1994 Census, Dirashe had a population of 89,900 in 17,181 households, of whom 45,617 were men and 49,038 women; 8,167 or 9.08% of its population were urban dwellers. The five largest ethnic groups reported in this woreda were the Dirashe (58.44%), the Gawwada (19.75%), the Mossiya (10.06%), the Amhara (2.99%), and the Konso (2.34%); all other ethnic groups made up 6.48% of the population. Dirashe was spoken as a first language by 55.08% of the inhabitants, 19.64% spoke Gawwada, 7.26% spoke Bussa, 5.41% spoke Oromiffa, and 4.97% spoke Amharic; the remaining 7.64% spoke all other primary languages reported. 51.63% of the population said they practiced traditional religions, 35.46% were Protestants, and 10.38% practiced Ethiopian Orthodox Christianity. Concerning education, 17.49% of the population were considered literate; 9.69% of children aged 7–12 were in primary school; 3.2% of the children aged 13–14 were in junior secondary school, and 3.48% of the inhabitants aged 15–18 were in senior secondary school. Concerning sanitary conditions, about 74% of the urban houses and 19% of all houses had access to safe drinking water at the time of the census; 64% of the urban and 12% of the total had toilet facilities.

Notes 

Southern Nations, Nationalities, and Peoples' Region
Special woredas of Ethiopia